William Lewis Hepler (born September 25, 1945) is a retired American professional baseball player. He was a left-handed pitcher who was drafted in 1965 by the New York Mets. He played for the Mets for one season before being sent back down to Minor League A-level baseball.

Hepler was selected in the 1965 Rule 5 draft from the Washington Senators after his debut season in professional ball. He appeared in 37 games played for the 1966 Mets, starting three. He gave up only one earned run in his first ten Major League innings pitched. All told, he worked in 69 innings and allowed 27 earned runs and 71 hits during the season, issuing 51 bases on balls and striking out 25.

Hepler returned to the minor leagues in 1967 and concluded his playing career after the 1970 season.

References

External links

1945 births
Living people
Baseball players from Virginia
Burlington Senators players
Durham Bulls players
Geneva Senators players
Major League Baseball pitchers
Memphis Blues players
New York Mets players
Williamsport Mets players
Winter Haven Mets players
People from Covington, Virginia